The 2017–18 San Jose State Spartans men's basketball team represented San Jose State University in the 2017–18 NCAA Division I men's basketball season. Led by first-year head coach Jean Prioleau, the Spartans played their home games at the Event Center Arena as members of the Mountain West Conference. They finished the season 4–26, 1–17 in Mountain West play to finish in last place. They lost in the first round of the Mountain West tournament to Wyoming.

Previous season
The Spartans finished the 2016–17 season 14–16, 7–11 in MW play to finish in eighth place. They lost to Utah State in the first round of the Mountain West tournament.

On July 10, 2017 Dave Wojcik resigned as head coach for personal reasons. On August 4, the school hired Jean Prioleau as head coach.

Off-season

Departures

Incoming transfers

2017 recruiting class

Preseason 
In a vote by conference media at the Mountain West media day, the Spartans were picked to finish in 10th place in the Mountain West.

Roster

Schedule and results

|-
!colspan=12 style=| Exhibition

|-
!colspan=12 style=| Non-conference regular season

|-
!colspan=12 style=| Mountain West regular season

|-
!colspan=9 style=|Mountain West tournament

 All games where a television provider is not indicated are televised on the Mountain West Network.

Source

References

San Jose State Spartans men's basketball seasons
San Jose State